Steve Eaton (born 25 December 1959) is an English footballer, who played as a full back in the Football League for Tranmere Rovers during the 1978–79 season. Eaton also played for Telford United. After leaving football, Eaton went on to refereeing and then later on in life working for Ford.

References

External links

Tranmere Rovers F.C. players
Northwich Victoria F.C. players
Association football fullbacks
English Football League players
1959 births
Living people
Footballers from Liverpool
English footballers